Warning is the sixth studio album by American rock band Green Day, released on October 3, 2000, by Reprise Records. Building upon its predecessor Nimrod (1997), it eschewed the band's trademark sound and incorporated acoustic elements and pop and folk styles. Lyrically, the album contains more optimistic and inspirational themes in comparison to the band's earlier releases. Warning was also Green Day's first album since Kerplunk (1991) that was not produced by Rob Cavallo, although he did have a hand in its production and was credited as executive producer.

Despite mixed criticism towards the band's stylistic change, the album received mostly positive reviews from critics, who praised vocalist/guitarist Billie Joe Armstrong's songwriting. Although it peaked at number four on the US Billboard 200, Warning represented the lowest commercial slump in Green Day's career, being their first album since signing to a major label not to achieve multi-platinum status. However, the album being leaked onto Napster three weeks before its release may have been a contributing factor to its low sales. The album has nonetheless been certified gold by the Recording Industry Association of America, and has sold over 1.2 million copies as of 2012. Worldwide it has sold 3.5 million copies.

Background
After taking a break from touring in promotion of the band's fourth album Insomniac (1995), Green Day recorded the more experimental Nimrod (1997). The record, which delved into a wider variety of genres including folk, ska, and surf rock, featured the unprecedented acoustic hit "Good Riddance (Time of Your Life)". Vocalist/guitarist Billie Joe Armstrong recalled that the song's stylistic departure from the group's earlier work made him anxious about the song's release: "I was scared for that song to come out...because it was such a vulnerable song, to put that song out and it was like which way will it end up going? It was really exciting and it kind of sparked more in us as songwriters to expand on that."

The band embarked on the Nimrod promotional tour, which largely featured more intimate shows with audiences of 1,500 to 3,000 people. By the end of the tour, the band noted that its audience had evolved. 924 Gilman Street, the punk club in the band's hometown that had once banned Green Day after the group signed with a major label, booked bassist Mike Dirnt's side project the Frustrators for a show. Dirnt described the experience as "a wonderful piece of closure". Punk rock music was no longer popular in the mainstream because nu metal acts such as Korn, Limp Bizkit, and Kid Rock were experiencing success. According to Studio 880 owner John Lucasey, the band was "definitely at a very big crossroads."

Recording

For Warning, Green Day initially opted to work with a producer other than Rob Cavallo, who had handled the production of the band's previous three albums. The group selected Scott Litt, who had previously worked with Nirvana and R.E.M. However, the band had disagreements with Litt over the album's musical direction; vocalist/guitarist Billie Joe Armstrong recalled that "It just didn't work out. He was really cool, but for that particular project, it just wasn't the right chemistry." The group subsequently brought Cavallo back in, but this time the band handled most of the production duties, with Cavallo instead serving as "executive producer". During the album's writing and early recording sessions, Armstrong repeatedly listened to Bob Dylan's 1965 record Bringing It All Back Home, which had a major influence over both Warnings musical experimentation and socially conscious lyrics.

The band began work on the album two years before entering the studio to record on April 1, 2000. During this period, the group members met five days a week to write new songs and rehearse old ones, with Tre Cool observing, "We've been practicing and writing songs and playing them and playing them and writing new songs and playing them and playing them... People think we're off in Hawaii kicking back and shit, but we're in Oakland playing our jams." The album was recorded at Studio 880 in Oakland. Cool noted of the band's work ethic in the studio, "We're not really sprinting. We're working at the same pace, but it's a pretty fast pace for recording. We're faster than every other band, pretty much. That's what I've been told." With the record, the band aimed to construct a solid list of tracks where "each song could be its own album". The group also made sure to make each song "well thought out and well placed" with regard to the album's tracklisting.

Music and lyrics
{{Listen|pos = right
 |filename    = 01 Warning 2.ogg
 |title       = "Warning"
 |description = The album's title track exemplifies Warning'''s "percussive acoustic" sound. It contains layered vocals and a "circling" riff which is a musical quotation from "Picture Book" by the Kinks.
 |filename2    = 06 Misery 2.ogg
 |title2       = "Misery"
 |description2 = The sixth track from the record, "Misery" features "mariachi brass" instrumentation, as well as strings, accordions, and acoustic guitar.
}}
With Warning, the band experimented with more acoustic guitars, and strove for a "not sappy acoustic... more aggressive, percussive acoustic" sound. Cool and bassist Mike Dirnt also emphasized "deeper" grooves on the record. The title track, a "densely produced blast of layered vocals [and] strummed acoustic guitars", features a "circling bass riff" similar to that of "Picture Book" by the Kinks. "Waiting", which has been categorized as a "retro-pop lament", is based on the riff from Petula Clark's 1964 song "Downtown".Spitz, 2006, p. 143 Its melody has also been stylistically compared to the Mamas & the Papas and Kiss. Ken Tucker of Entertainment Weekly felt that "Misery" is "probably Billie Joe's idea of a Brecht-Weill pop operetta." It features "mariachi brass" instrumentation, as well as strings, accordions, and acoustic guitar. The song's five-minute length has been called "an epic by Green Day standards". The use of a harmonica on "Hold On" has been compared to the Beatles' "Love Me Do" and "I Should Have Known Better." "Macy's Day Parade" contains elements of folk and pop.

The album features more positive and uplifting lyrics in comparison with Green Day's earlier work. Cool noted that, "It's got the sarcasm, it's got the snottiness, but it's got a little light at the end of the tunnel." Warning also contains more explicitly political themes, as exemplified by tracks such as "Minority". This was inspired by Armstrong's fear that presidential nominee Al Gore was going to lose the 2000 U.S. presidential election and that "someone really conservative" would take office. He recalled, "We've always tried to keep an ear to the ground and keep our eyes open to what's going on...that's one reason why I was really taking my time writing songs to really [make an impact]. Instead of just writing an overly knee-jerk reaction." According to Sal Cinquemani of Slant Magazine, the lyrics of "Minority" serve as "a reminder of the youthful mentality of Green Day's early work". "Misery" tells various stories in its verses, all of which end unhappily. The first verse centers on a girl named Virginia who was a "lot lizard", a term for a prostitute who exchanges sex for money with truck drivers at interstate highway truck stops. "Blood, Sex and Booze" explores the subject of sadomasochism. "Church On Sunday" features lyrics in its pre-chorus that were originally written for the Nimrod demo "Black Eyeliner," which didn't see an official release until 2023.

According to some publications, such as LA Times, The Buffalo News, Sun-Sentinel, and Music Box Magazine Green Day departs from their punk rock sound with this album. Despite this, some other publications label the album as punk rock. In addition, the album has also been cited as pop-punk, power pop, folk punk,Spitz, 2006, p. 151. and alternative rock.

Release
Commercial performanceWarning peaked at number four on the Billboard 200, remaining on the chart for 25 weeks and it sold 156,000 copies on its first week according to Billboard. On December 1, 2000, the record was certified gold by Recording Industry Association of America (RIAA), for shipments of over 500,000 copies. In Canada, the record reached the number two position and stayed on the chart for five weeks. On August 1, 2001, the album was certified platinum by the Canadian Recording Industry Association for shipments of over 100,000 units. Warning also reached the top ten in multiple countries outside of North America, including Australia, Italy, and the United Kingdom. The album was later certified platinum by the Australian Recording Industry Association (ARIA) for shipments of over 70,000 copies. As of December 20, 2012, Warning has sold 1.2 million copies, according to Nielsen SoundScan.

Critical receptionWarning received generally positive reviews from music critics. At Metacritic, which assigns a normalised rating out of 100 to reviews from mainstream critics, the album received an average score of 72 based on 19 reviews, which indicates "generally favorable reviews". Entertainment Weeklys Ken Tucker perceived a maturity in the album's lyrical content and called its music "as peppy as any Green Day have recorded". Charlotte Robinson of PopMatters commended Billie Joe Armstrong's lyrics and noted the band for embracing "the pop bent that has always been a part of their sound". The A.V. Clubs Stephen Thompson stated "Green Day has never made a record so slick and musically mature". Los Angeles Times writer Natalie Nichols wrote that the album "reveal[s] them shaking off the transitional aspects of 1997's Nimrod to craft a more coherent, less aggressive but still rebellious collection that also draws on the even older pop traditions of Bob Dylan, the Beatles and the Who". "Metal" Mike Saunders of The Village Voice viewed Warning as the band's best work and compared its music to that of the Beatles' Rubber Soul (1965). In his consumer guide for The Village Voice, critic Robert Christgau gave the album an A− rating, indicating "the kind of garden-variety good record that is the great luxury of musical micromarketing and overproduction. Anyone open to its aesthetic will enjoy more than half its tracks". Christgau noted "professionalism, craft, artistic growth" rather than maturity in Armstrong's songwriting and elaborated on his change in musical direction, stating:

By contrast, NMEs Andy Capper was ambivalent towards the band's "less electric, more organic sound" and stated "Older. More Mature. Warning is the sound of a band losing its way". Greg Kot of Rolling Stone wrote that Armstrong "can't muster the same excitement for his more mature themes" and stated "Who wants to listen to songs of faith, hope and social commentary from what used to be snot-core's biggest-selling band?". Adam Downer of Sputnikmusic gave it three out of five stars and commented that it "consists of instant classics like Minority and Macy's Day Parade, but it also is filled with garbage songs as well". Spin writer Jesse Berrett stated "these maturity moves buoy muzzy be-yourselfism ... Nor does everything in the stylistic grab bag fit", but concluded by complimenting Armstrong's "earnestly good-hearted" lyrics and wrote that "this album is after... evidence that even the snottiest deserve grace and the chance to age into warmth". Q gave the album three out of five stars and described it as "Hugely likeable, terribly noisy and cute, as well as being jammed with proper pop songs". Neal Weiss of Yahoo! Music called the album "crafty pop-rock" and stated "Some might wish Green Day never decided to grow up like this, but others might consider it a starting point to take the band seriously". Slant Magazine editor Sal Cinquemani perceived elements of folk and "pop sensibilities", writing that the album "displays just how well Green Day can construct pop songs".

Retrospect
Writing in 2009 with regard to Warnings lackluster commercial performance, James Montgomery of MTV News called the record "unjustly overlooked" and applauded Armstrong's "super strong" songwriting on the album. In The New Rolling Stone Album Guide (2004), Rolling Stone journalist Nick Catucci gave the album four out of five stars and wrote that the band "fully focus on the textures that have always differentiated their sturdy grooves and simple melodies". Catucci called the songs "speedy, neatly packaged reinterpretations of pop-rock history, from the Beatles to Creedence Clearwater Revival to the Ramones themselves". AllMusic editor Stephen Thomas Erlewine called it "gleeful, unabashed fun" and complimented Green Day for "embracing their fondness for pop and making the best damn album they'd ever made". Erlewine expressed that the band displays "melodic ingenuity and imaginative arrangements" and elaborated on its musical significance, stating "Warning may not be an innovative record per se, but it's tremendously satisfying; it finds the band at a peak of songcraft and performance, doing it all without a trace of self-consciousness. It's the first great pure pop album of the new millennium". Dom Passantino of Stylus Magazine cited it as "the most influential album on the British pop landscape since 1996 (Spice, naturally)", noting it as a significant influence on "the two biggest bands in the UK at the moment, and indeed for the past few years, Busted and McFly". Passantino called Warning "a great album" and viewed that Green Day "seemed to be bored with their genre-medium, but simultaneously knowledgeable that any attempt to boundary-hop will end with them falling on their face".

Promotion

While Green Day was nearing completion of Warning, the band announced it would be performing on the 2000 Vans Warped Tour during the summer before the album's October release. Although the group had been invited to perform on the tour before, the band was unable to do so due to scheduling conflicts. Because of Green Day's new stylistic change displayed on Warning, the band was considered an unconventional choice for the tour. Jason White, guitarist for Armstrong's side project Pinhead Gunpowder, was recruited to perform with the band to add "more power" to the group's sound; White observed that "Even I was like, 'Why are Green Day on the Warped Tour?'". Fat Mike of NOFX recalled, "They were the biggest band on the tour but it wasn't by far. Green Day weren't super popular at that time. I think they did the Warped tour because they wanted to get popular again." He also went on to call Warning "probably their worst album, I think. It's what happens, the ups and downs." However, Joel Madden of Good Charlotte, whose 2002 release The Young and the Hopeless outsold Warning, opined that "I was definitely aware that our record at the time sold more maybe than their record but I think we idolized them so much that it didn't matter. We thought Warning was one of their best records."

In January 2001, Colin Merry of the English rock band Other Garden filed a breach of copyright lawsuit against Green Day, claiming that the album's title track is a "reworked" version of his band's 1992 song "Never Got the Chance". Merry noted that despite both songs' similarity to the riff of "Picture Book" by the Kinks, the similarity between "Warning" and "Never Got the Chance" was more "striking". Green Day denied the accusations, and although Merry requested to halt all royalties from "Warning", the lawsuit was later dropped.

Green Day also co-headlined a "shared bill" with fellow Californian pop-punk band Blink-182 on the Pop Disaster Tour from April to June 2002. The two bands traded off headlining positions throughout the tour, because Blink-182 was experiencing higher record sales at the time, while Green Day had experienced mainstream success for a longer period of time. Armstrong explained Green Day's desire to perform on the tour by stating, "We really wanted to be part of an event. We figured putting the two biggest pop punk bands on the planet together was definitely going to be an event." In his book Nobody Likes You: Inside the Turbulent Life, Times and Music of Green Day, author Marc Spitz likened Blink-182 headlining a tour with Green Day to "Frank Sinatra, Jr. headlining over Frank Sinatra."

Track listing

Personnel
Credits for Warning adapted from liner notes.

Musicians
Green Day
 Billie Joe Armstrong – vocals, guitar, harmonica, mandolin
 Mike Dirnt – bass, vocals, Farfisa on "Misery"
 Tré Cool – drums, percussion, accordion

Additional musicians
 Benmont Tench – additional musician on "Church on Sunday"
 Gary Meek – saxophone on "Jackass"
 David Campbell – string arrangements
 Mistress Simone – dominatrix

Production
 Green Day – producers
 Rob Cavallo – executive producer
 Cheryl Jenets - production coordination
 Jack Joseph Puig – mixing
 Ken Allardyce – engineer
 Josh "Tone" Weaver – additional engineer
 Richard "Rich" Ash – additional engineer
 Tal Herzberg – G3 operator
 Kenny Butler – drum technician
 Timmy Chunks – guitar technician
 Bill Schneider – guitar and bass technician
 Allen Sides – studio consultant
 Pat Magnarella – management
 Ted Jensen – mastering
 Marina Chavez, Lance Bang – photography
 Chris Bilheimer – additional photography, art direction

Charts

Weekly charts

Year-end charts

Singles

Certifications and sales

 References 

Works cited
 
Ditmore, Melissa Hope. (August 30, 2006) Encyclopedia of Prostitution and Sex Work. Greenwood. .
Spitz, Marc.  (November 1, 2006) Nobody Likes You: Inside the Turbulent Life, Times, and Music of Green Day''.  Hyperion.  .

External links

Warning at YouTube (streamed copy where licensed)
 
 

Green Day albums
2000 albums
Reprise Records albums
Folk punk albums
Power pop albums by American artists